= Giuditta Schiavo =

Italian footballer

Personal information
- Date of birth: 21 March 1990 (age 36)
- Position: Defender

Team information
- Current team: Vicenza

Senior career*
Years	Team	Apps	(Gls)
2003-2007	Vicenza		
- * Club domestic league appearances and goals

Giuditta Schiavo (born 21 March 1990) is an Italian professional footballer who plays as a defender for Vicenza.
